Microsoft was one of the first companies to implement Unicode in their products. Windows NT was the first operating system that used "wide characters" in system calls. Using the (now obsolete) UCS-2 encoding scheme at first, it was upgraded to the variable-width encoding UTF-16 starting with Windows 2000, allowing a representation of additional planes with surrogate pairs. However Microsoft did not support UTF-8 in its API until May 2019.

Before 2019, Microsoft emphasized UTF-16 (i.e. -W API), but has since recommended to use UTF-8 (at least in some cases), on Windows and Xbox (and in other of its products), even states "UTF-8 is the universal code page for internationalization [and] UTF-16 [..] a unique burden that Windows places on code that targets multiple platforms. [..] Windows [is] moving forward to support UTF-8 to remove this unique burden [resulting] in fewer internationalization issues in apps and games".

A large amount of Microsoft documentation uses the word "Unicode" to refer explicitly to the UTF-16 encoding. Anything else, including UTF-8, is not "Unicode" in Microsoft's outdated language (while UTF-8 and UTF-16 are both Unicode according to the Unicode Standard, or encodings/"transformation formats" of).

In various Windows families

Windows NT based systems 
Current Windows versions and all back to Windows XP and prior Windows NT (3.x, 4.0) are shipped with system libraries that support string encoding of two types: 16-bit "Unicode" (UTF-16 since Windows 2000) and a (sometimes multibyte) encoding called the "code page" (or incorrectly referred to as ANSI code page). 16-bit functions have names suffixed with 'W' (from "wide") such as SetWindowTextW. Code page oriented functions use the suffix 'A' for "ANSI" such as SetWindowTextA (some other conventions were used for APIs that were copied from other systems, such as _wfopen/fopen or wcslen/strlen). This split was necessary because many languages, including C, did not provide a clean way to pass both 8-bit and 16-bit strings to the same function.

Microsoft attempted to support Unicode "portably" by providing a "UNICODE" switch to the compiler, that switches unsuffixed "generic" calls from the 'A' to the 'W' interface and converts all string constants to "wide" UTF-16 versions. This does not actually work because it does not translate UTF-8 outside of string constants, resulting in code that attempts to open files just not compiling.

Earlier, and independent of the "UNICODE" switch, Windows also provided the Multibyte Character Sets (MBCS) API switch. This changes some functions that don't work in MBCS such as strrev to an MBCS-aware one such as _mbsrev.

Windows CE 
In (the now discontinued) Windows CE, UTF-16 was used almost exclusively, with the 'A' API mostly missing. A limited set of ANSI API is available in Windows CE 5.0, for use on a reduced set of locales that may be selectively built onto the runtime image.

Windows 9x 

In 2001, Microsoft released a special supplement to Microsoft's old Windows 9x systems. It includes a dynamic link library, 'unicows.dll', (only 240 KB) containing the 16-bit flavor (the ones with the letter W on the end) of all the basic functions of Windows API. It is merely a translation layer: SetWindowTextW will simply convert its input using the current codepage and call SetWindowTextA.

UTF-8 
Microsoft Windows (Windows XP and later) has a code page designated for UTF-8, code page 65001 or CP_UTF8. For a long time, it was impossible to set the locale code page to 65001, leaving this code page only available for (a) explicit conversion functions such as MultiByteToWideChar and/or (b) the Win32 console command chcp 65001 to translate stdin/out between UTF-8 and UTF-16. This meant that "narrow" functions, in particular fopen (which opens files), couldn't be called with UTF-8 strings, and in fact there was no way to open all possible files using fopen no matter what the locale was set to and/or what bytes were put in the string, as none of the available locales could produce all possible UTF-16 characters. This problem also applied to all other APIs that take or return 8-bit strings, including Windows ones such as SetWindowText.

Programs that wanted to use UTF-8, in particular code intended to be portable to other operating systems, needed a workaround for this deficiency. The usual work-around was to add new functions to open files that convert UTF-8 to UTF-16 using MultiByteToWideChar and call the "wide" function instead of fopen. Dozens of multi-platform libraries added wrapper functions to do this conversion on Windows (and pass UTF-8 through unchanged on others), an example is a proposed addition to Boost, . Another popular work-around was to convert the name to the 8.3 filename equivalent, this is necessary if the fopen is inside a library. None of these workarounds are considered good, as they require changes to the code that works on non-Windows.

In April 2018 (or possibly November 2017), with insider build 17035 (nominal build 17134) for Windows 10, a "Beta: Use Unicode UTF-8 for worldwide language support" checkbox appeared for setting the locale code page to UTF-8. This allows for calling "narrow" functions, including fopen and SetWindowTextA, with UTF-8 strings. However this is a system-wide setting and a program cannot assume it is set.

In May 2019, Microsoft added the ability for a program to set the code page to UTF-8 itself, allowing programs written to use UTF-8 to be run by non-expert users.

, Microsoft recommends programmers use UTF-8 (e.g. instead of any other 8-bit encoding), on Windows and Xbox, and may be recommending its use instead of UTF-16, even stating "UTF-8 is the universal code page for internationalization [and] UTF-16 [..] is a unique burden that Windows places on code that targets multiple platforms." Microsoft does appear to be transitioning to UTF-8, stating it previously emphasized its alternative, and in Windows 11 some system files are required to use UTF-8 and do not require a Byte Order Mark. Notepad can now recognize UTF-8 without the Byte Order Mark, and can be told to write UTF-8 without a Byte Order Mark. Some other Microsoft products are using UTF-8 internally, including Visual Studio and their SQL Server 2019, with Microsoft claiming 35% speed increase from use of UTF-8, and "nearly 50% reduction in storage requirements."

Programming platforms 
Microsoft's compilers often fail at producing UTF-8 string constants from UTF-8 source files. The most reliable method is to turn off UNICODE, not mark the input file as being UTF-8 (i.e. do not use a BOM), and arrange the string constants to have the UTF-8 bytes. If a BOM was added, a Microsoft compiler will interpret the strings as UTF-8, convert them to UTF-16, then convert them back into the current locale, thus destroying the UTF-8. Without a BOM and using a single-byte locale, Microsoft compilers will leave the bytes in a quoted string unchanged. On modern systems setting the code page to UTF-8 helps considerably, but invalid byte sequences are still not preserved (using  can work around this).

See also 
 Bush hid the facts, a text encoding mojibake

Notes

References

External links 
 

Unicode
Microsoft Windows